Ronald Deryk George Springett (22 July 1935 – 12 September 2015) was an English professional footballer who played as a goalkeeper.

He began his career with QPR in 1953 where he made 147 appearances over two spells. He had a nine-year spell with Sheffield Wednesday between 1958 and 1967 and amassed 384 appearances for them before returning to QPR to finish his career.

He earned 33 caps for England between 1959 and 1966 and was part of the squad that won the 1966 FIFA World Cup.

Club career

Springett began his career at QPR in 1953. While at QPR, he was selected to play in the Third Division South representative team in 1957. He moved to Sheffield Wednesday for £10,000 in 1958  and made 384 appearances for Wednesday before returning to QPR in May 1967. As part of that deal, his brother Peter, also a goalkeeper, moved to Wednesday from QPR.

Springett was a member of the Sheffield Wednesday team beaten 3–2 by Everton in the 1966 FA Cup Final at Wembley.

International career

Springett made 33 capped appearances and 1 uncapped representative appearance* for England (*uncapped match - part of Football Association's centenary celebrations), all while at Sheffield Wednesday and until then the most international appearances by any Sheffield Wednesday player. He held this club record for 26 years until it was broken by Nigel Worthington. He made his England debut against Northern Ireland at Wembley in 1959 saving a Jimmy McIlroy penalty just before half-time to help secure a narrow 2–1 victory. He also saved a penalty in a match against Peru in May 1962. He had been the first choice goalkeeper during the 1962 World Cup in Chile. His final cap was against Norway in 1966 shortly before the World Cup finals. At international level, Springett also made 9 appearances for the Football League (team drawn from players of all Football League teams irrespective of nationality).

He was allocated the No.12 shirt as a member of the England squad that won the 1966 World Cup by beating West Germany by 4 goals to 2. However, only the 11 players on the pitch during that match received winners' medals. Following a Football Association led campaign to persuade FIFA to award medals to all the winners' squad members, it was announced by FIFA, on 26 November 2007, that all non-starting members of World Cup winning squads (1930–1974 competitions) would also receive a winners medal. This list included Ron Springett, and so, on 10 June 2009, Springett was presented with his medal by British Prime Minister Gordon Brown at a ceremony at 10 Downing Street.

Testimonial
Sheffield Wednesday held a testimonial for Ronald Springett on 25 September 1967 at Hillsborough Stadium. (A Sheffield United XI beat a Sheffield Wednesday XI 3–2) The game was watched by 23,070 fans. Following his death, Sheffield Wednesday honoured Ron by featuring him on the cover of the matchday programme and observing a minutes applause prior to the home game against Fulham on 19 September 2015. Wednesday won the game 3–2. In a post match interview, Owls head coach Carlos Carvalhal dedicated the win to Springett.

Style of play
Springett has been described by The Independent as a clever, consistent, "brave and agile goalkeeper", with an excellent positional sense. Despite his small stature and lack of physicality, which gave him a slight disadvantage against larger, more physical centre-forwards, he was "adept at choosing the precise moment to smother shots at the feet of attackers, accepting that such plunges would result in occasional injuries. Swift of foot, deftly assured with his hands and adept at judging when to leave his goal-line, he could be a gloriously entertaining performer, though for all his acrobatics, his lack of height occasionally made him vulnerable to sudden long shots." Regarded as one of England's greatest ever goalkeepers, he was known for his determination, athleticism, and the "thoroughness of his preparation, as he kept a notebook in which recorded the preferred spot-kick methods of all his leading opponents".

Personal Life

Ron Springett had a daughter Terri Springett who also played professional football.

Death
Springett died on 12 September 2015.

Honours
Sheffield Wednesday
Football League Division Two: 1958–59
FA Cup: runners-up 1965–66

England
 World Cup: 1966

References

External links
 Sheffield Wednesday Official Site
 Englandfanzine
 

English footballers
Sheffield Wednesday F.C. players
Queens Park Rangers F.C. players
England international footballers
Association football goalkeepers
1962 FIFA World Cup players
1966 FIFA World Cup players
FIFA World Cup-winning players
Footballers from Fulham
English Football League players
1935 births
2015 deaths
English Football League representative players
FA Cup Final players